Kansas Speedway is a  tri-oval race track in the Village West area near Kansas City, Kansas, United States. It was built in 2001 and it currently hosts two annual NASCAR race weekends. The IndyCar Series also held races at the venue until 2011. The speedway is owned and operated by NASCAR.

History

International Speedway Corporation began exploring the idea of building a racing facility in the midwest in 1996. Attention was turned towards the Kansas City area in 1997. Officials considered both the Missouri and Kansas side of the city but eventually settled with the Kansas side because of better funding. Architecture firm HNTB, which also designed Chicagoland Speedway, provided civil engineering and site development, landscape design, and race track design. Design firm DLR Group provided architecture and engineering of all buildings on site, and grandstand design. Firm Turner Construction was selected to provide construction management. The land to be acquired required eminent domain proceedings by county officials, but the Kansas Supreme Court approved the government's taking. The demand at the ticket sales prompted ISC officials to expand the planned 32 by an additional 36, expanding capacity from 75,000 to 82,000. Speedway officials were hopeful to have the track completed sometime in 2000, and possibly host a race, but construction was delayed by weather and further complicated by lawsuits from nearby land owners. In May 2000, both IndyCar and NASCAR announced events to be held at the speedway for the 2001 season. Track paving began in September 2000, and construction of the speedway was completed in early 2001.

The building of the speedway has had a significant impact on the nearby area, even before construction was finished. New commercial developments sprung up around the speedway, including a movie theater complex, an outdoor retail mall, and hotels. A 2008 survey by The Washington Economics Group revealed that Kansas Speedway brings $243 million to the state of Kansas each year. It also provides over 5000 jobs, with 4000 jobs coming directly from track operations.
Additional seats have been added since initial construction. In 2003, 1,600 seats were added, and in 2005, 1,500 seats plus a  concession and restroom building were added. Both expansions were headed by the track's original contractors, HNTB and Turner Construction.

In 2011 Kansas Speedway and Richard Petty Driving Experience announced an exclusive agreement where visitors have the opportunity to experience the speedway from a unique point-of-view behind the wheel of a race car.

The speedway constructed the $380-million Penn National Gaming Hollywood Hotel and Casino at the track. The hotel/casino overlooks turn two and opened to the public on February 12, 2012. The state-of-the-art casino features a  gaming floor capacity for 2,300 slot machines, 61 table games and 25 poker tables. It also features  of other amenities including restaurants, clubs and nightlife attractions. The addition of the casino is estimated to bring nearly 440,000 tourists per year and create over 1,000 full-time positions; elevating the state to a first-class, year-round tourist destination. On February 17, 2010, the president of Kansas Speedway announced that Penn National Gaming will sponsor the fall NASCAR Cup race for the next ten years in the Hollywood Casino 400.

Lights were installed from mid-2010 to early 2011, this comes along with the addition of a second NASCAR weekend beginning with the 2011 season. All the NASCAR races at the track are scheduled to be run during the day, with the lights being available in case of a rain delay. The first night race at the track was an ARCA race on October 7, 2011. On October 11, 2013, it was announced that Darlington Speedway's lone NASCAR event and Kansas's spring race will swap dates for 2014, with Kansas becoming a night race. The fall race at the track will remain a day event.

In July 2011, the speedway announced they would reconfigure the speedway following the 2012 STP 400. Some of the changes included adding a road course in the infield, repaving the oval, and adding variable banking. On August 28–29 the track's reconfiguration of the oval took the checkered flag as the NASCAR Cup Series held a Goodyear Tire test for the upcoming October 21 Hollywood Casino 400. As a result of the project, the banking in the turns was increased from a uniform 15 degrees to a progressively 17–20 degrees, the grass on the inside of the backstretch was paved over for safety reasons, and due to the drought in Kansas, new grass on the front stretch was rolled using sod trucks. In 2013, the Grand-Am Rolex Sports Car Series announced they would come to the track for the 2013 season.

On January 28, 2019, it was revealed on ISC's 2018 annual report that the speedway's track seating was reduced from 64,000 to 48,000.

Track length of paved oval
The track length is disputed by the two major series that run at Kansas Speedway.

Lap records

The fastest official race lap records at Kansas Speedway are listed as:

Races

Current races
NASCAR Cup Series
Hollywood Casino 400 (2001–present)
AdventHealth 400 (2011–present)
NASCAR Xfinity Series
Kansas Lottery 300 (2001–present)
NASCAR Camping World Truck Series
Heart of America 200 (2001–present)
Kansas Lottery 200 (2020, 2022–present)
ARCA Menards Series
Kansas Lottery 150 (2001–present)
Dutch Boy 150 (2020–present)

Former races
IMSA Sportscar Championship
Grand Prix of Kansas (2013–2014)
IndyCar Series
 RoadRunner Turbo Indy 300 (2001–2010)
Indy Lights
Kansas Lottery 100 (2002–2004, 2008–2009)
NASCAR Winston West
Kansas 100 (2001–2002)
CART Dayton Indy Lights Series
Kansas 100 (2001)
USAC Silver Crown Series
KansasSpeedway.com 100

Track records

NASCAR Cup Series winners

Notes
 Jeff Gordon, Jimmie Johnson, Kevin Harvick, Denny Hamlin, and Joey Logano are all tied for most wins at the track with three wins each.
2007 : Race shortened due to rain.
2011 (fall), 2015 (fall), 2019 (both):  Race extended due to a NASCAR Overtime finish. 2019 (fall) took two attempts.
2020 (spring): Race postponed from May 31 to July 23 due to the COVID-19 pandemic.

Non-racing events
Since 2016, the speedway has hosted the American Royal BBQ competition.

See also
Located about 1 mile west of the speedway:
 Cricket Wireless Amphitheater
 Kansas City Renaissance Festival
 National Agricultural Center and Hall of Fame

References

External links

 Kansas Speedway Official Site
 
 Kansas Speedway Page on NASCAR.com
 Kansas Speedway on RacewayReport.com – Local area information, track specs, mapping, news and more.
 Richard Petty Driving Experience at Kansas Speedway

Sports in the Kansas City metropolitan area
Landmarks in Kansas
NASCAR tracks
Motorsport venues in Kansas
ARCA Menards Series tracks
IndyCar Series tracks
Buildings and structures in Kansas City, Kansas
NASCAR races at Kansas Speedway
Tourist attractions in Wyandotte County, Kansas
1999 establishments in Kansas
Sports venues completed in 1999